Harry James Gunner (born November 25, 1944) is a former American football defensive end. He played for the Cincinnati Bengals from 1968 to 1969 and for the Chicago Bears in 1970. Gunner played football and basketball at Oregon State University, where he was one of the first two African-Americans to play for the school as a scholarship athlete.

References

1944 births
Living people
American football defensive ends
Oregon State Beavers football players
Cincinnati Bengals players
Chicago Bears players